Grylloblattella cheni is a species of insect in the family Grylloblattidae. Its type locality is Ake Kule Lake in Xinjiang, China.

References

Grylloblattidae
Insects of China